Saad Bakheet Mubarak is an Emirati footballer who represented the UAE at the 1996 AFC Asian Cup. He also played for Al Shabab. He usually plays on the right flank.

External links

1970 births
Living people
Emirati footballers
United Arab Emirates international footballers
Al Shabab Al Arabi Club Dubai players
al Jazira Club players
1992 AFC Asian Cup players
1996 AFC Asian Cup players
1997 FIFA Confederations Cup players
UAE Pro League players
Association football midfielders
Footballers at the 1994 Asian Games
Asian Games competitors for the United Arab Emirates